Earl Steffa Moran (December 8, 1893 – January 17, 1984) was an American 20th-century pin-up and glamour artist.

Biography
Moran's first instruction in art came under the direction of John Stich, an elderly German artist who also taught the great illustrator W.H.D. Koerner.  Moran also studied with Walter Biggs at the Chicago Art Institute.

Moran later studied at the famed Art Students League in Manhattan, where he learned from the muralists Vincent Drumond, Robert Henri, Thomas Fogarty (Norman Rockwell's teacher), and the legendary anatomist George Bridgman.  After moving back to Chicago in 1931 and opening a small studio where he specialized in photography and illustration, he sent some paintings of bikini-clad girls to two calendar companies; when both Brown and Bigelow and Thomas D. Murphy Company bought the work, his career was officially launched.

Moran signed an exclusive contract with Brown and Bigelow in 1932 and by 1937, his pinups had sold millions of calendars for the company.  In 1940, Life ran a feature article entitled "Speaking of Pictures" which mostly focused on Moran's work and made him a national celebrity.  In 1941, Moran helped the magazine publisher, Robert Harrison, to launch a new men's magazine called Beauty Parade, and he later contributed pin-ups to other Harrison magazines such as Flirt, Wink and Giggles.

In 1946, Moran moved to Hollywood though he had already painted many movie stars including Betty Grable, for publicity posters.  Soon after his arrival, he interviewed a young starlet named Norma Jeane Dougherty who wanted to model for him. For the next four years, Marilyn Monroe posed for Moran and the two became friends. She always credited him with making her legs look better than they were as she felt they were too thin. Moran's work during this time period is now his most valuable; a Moran Marilyn pastel sold for $83,650, nearly doubling the previous record for one of his works, when the Craig MacMillan collection was sold at Heritage Auctions in February 2011.

Moran lived in the San Fernando Valley from 1951 to 1955, hosting fabulous parties, directing and starring in short television films, painting portraits of Earl Carroll's Vanities Girls, and maintaining his position as a star of the pin-up world.

After a move to Las Vegas (circa 1955), Moran decided to devote his time to painting fine-art subjects, with nudes as his favorite theme.  Signing with Aaron Brothers Galleries, he painted for collectors until 1982, when his eyesight failed. Some of his earlier works for Harrison were signed "Steffa" or "Black Smith". Moran died in Santa Monica, CA, on January 17, 1984.

Moran's daughter by his first marriage, Marie, became a film actress in Hollywood in the 1940s under the name Peggy Moran. She retired fairly early to marry well-known Hollywood director Henry Koster.

References

Students of Robert Henri
Pin-up artists
American illustrators
People from Belle Plaine, Iowa
1893 births
1984 deaths